is a Japanese politician from the Liberal Democratic Party. He currently serves as member of the House of Councillors for Aomori at-large district.

References

1958 births
Living people
People from Hachinohe
Members of the House of Councillors (Japan)
Liberal Democratic Party (Japan) politicians